The kings of Dumnonia were the rulers of the large Brythonic kingdom of Dumnonia in the south-west of Great Britain during the Sub-Roman and early medieval periods.

A list of Dumnonian kings is one of the hardest of the major Dark Age kingdoms to accurately compile, as it is confused by Arthurian legend, complicated by strong associations with the kings of Wales and Brittany, and obscured by the Saxon advance. Therefore, this list should be treated with caution.

Dumnonian kings
The original Celtic chiefs of the Dumnonii ruled in the south-west corner of the British Isles until faced with the arrival of the Romans in their territory in c. AD 55, when the Romans established a legionary fortress at Isca Dumnoniorum (modern Exeter). Although subjugated by c. AD 78, the civitas Dumnoniorum was among the regions of Roman Britain least affected by Roman influence. Known as Caer Uisc, Exeter was inhabited by Dumnonian Britons until c. 936, when King Athelstan expelled them. Several other royal residences may also have served the kings of Dumnonia or Cornwall, including Tintagel and Cadbury Castle.

Legendary 'Dukes of Cornwall' recorded by Geoffrey of Monmouth
Caradoc ( 290 – c. 305)
Donault, brother of Caradoc (c. 305 – c. 340)

Presumed kings appearing in the ancestries of later monarchs
Conan Meriadoc ap Gereint, '"Conan the Merry" (c. 340 – c. 387)
Gadeon ap Conan (c. 387 – c. 390)
Guoremor ap Gadeon (c. 387 – c. 400)
Tutwal ap Guoremor (c. 400 – c. 410)
Conomor ap Tutwal (c. 410 – c. 435)
Constantine Corneu ap Conomar, "Constantine of Cornwall" (c. 435 – c. 443)

Kings recorded in Welsh records and literature
Erbin ap Constantine (c. 443 – c. 480)
Geraint Llyngesic ab Erbin, "Gerren the Fleet Owner" (c. 480 – c. 514)
Cado ap Gerren (c. 514 – c. 530)
Custennin ap Cado, probably "Saint Custennin" (c. 530 – c. 560)
Gerren rac Denau ap Custennin, "Gerren for the South" (c. 560 – c. 598)

William of Malmesbury
Gwrgan: William of Malmesbury reports the terms of a grant of land made by King Gwrgan of Damnonia to the "old church" at Glastonbury in AD 601 in the time of Abbot Worgret.

Possible rulers given in the early 17th-century Book of Baglan as ancestors of an 'Earl of Cornwall'
Bledric ap Custennin (c. 598 – c. 613)
Clemen ap Bledric (c. 613 – c. 633)
Petroc Baladrddellt ap Clemen, "Petroc Splintered Spear" (c. 633 – c. 654)
Culmin ap Petroc (c. 659 – c. 661)
Donyarth ap Culmin (c. 661 – c. 700)

Kings recorded in Anglo-Saxon sources
Geraint (c. 700 – c. 710)

Breton Princes of Armorican Dumnonia, from the Life of Saint Winnoc;
see also Domnonée. (The earlier portion follows the Dumnonian line beginning with Gereint, Cado, Erbin, Guitol ap Gradlon, Marchell, and Riothamus)
Riwal (510–520)
Deroch (520–535), son of Riwal
Iona (535–540), son of Deroch 
Judual (Judwal), son of Iona (540–545)
Conomor (540–555), count of Poher, first regent, then usurper, possibly Mark of Cornwall
Judwal (555–580, re-established)
Judaël (580–605), older son of Judwal
Haëloc (605–610), younger son of Judaël
Saint Judicael (r. 610–640, † 647/652), elder son of Judaël, abdicated
Judoc (r. 640–640, † 669), younger son of Judaël, renounced the throne
Saint Winnoc (r. 640, † 717), possibly a son of Judicael, renounced the throne.

Native tradition
Susan Pearce views the only native 4th- to 7th-century Dumnonian rulers known to history as:
Constantine (Welsh Custennin Gorneu), mentioned in De Excidio et Conquestu Britanniae
Erbin
Geraint (Welsh Geraint fab Erbin)
Cadwy (Cado)

Pearce identifies Constantine with the Constantine mentioned by Gildas, anchoring his reign to the 6th century, and giving later dates for the reigns of Erbin, Geraint, and Cadwy.

Cornish kings

By the end of the 8th century, Dumnonia was much reduced in size by the advance of the West Saxons and the remaining territory became a rump state in Cornwall. The generally accepted date for this transition is around 800.

Recorded in Old Welsh documents, Saints' Lives and in local and Arthurian tradition
 King Mark – of Tristan and Iseult fame, probably ruled in the late 5th century. According to Cornish folklore, he held court at Tintagel.
 King Salomon – father of Saint Cybi, probably ruled after Mark; not to be confused with Salomon, King of Brittany.
 Dungarth – was recorded by the Annales Cambriae as having drowned in 876. The Annales refer to him as "rex Cerniu", King of Cornwall.

In records open to interpretation

Ricatus (fl. c.900s) is mentioned on a memorial stone; he may have ruled a more localised region.
Huwal of the West Welsh (c.910–c.926), about whom there has been controversy since the 19th century. He only appears in the Anglo-Saxon Chronicle entry for 927, accepting King Athelstan of Wessex as his overlord. 'West Wales' was an old term for Dumnonia or Cornwall, but may also refer to present day West Wales, then generally known as Deheubarth, where Hywel Dda was king.

The Book of Baglan
An early 17th century pedigree of a so-called 'Earl of Cornwall' in the Book of Baglan may possibly represent a list of rulers in Cornwall.

Ithel Eiddyn ap Donyarth (Ithel the Rock) (c.710–c.715)
Dyfnwal Boifunall ap Ithel (Dyfnwal of Boifunall) (fl. c.730s)
Cawrdolli ap Dyfnwal (fl. c.750s)
Oswallt ap Cawrdolli (fl. c.770s)
Hernam ap Oswallt (fl. c.790s)
Hopkin ap Hernam (fl. c.810s)
Mordaf ap Hopkin (fl. c.830s)
Fferferdyn ap Mordaf (fl. c.850s)
Donyarth (c.865–c.876)
Eluid ap Fferferdyn (fl. c.880s)
Alanorus ap Eluid (fl. c.890s)

Others
Antiquarians from the sixteenth century on recorded claims that Condor – sometimes described as a descendant of the Cornish royal line – paid homage to William I of England at the time of the Norman Conquest in 1066 in order to remain Earl of Cornwall.
In the De Gestis Herewardi Saxonis written in the 12th century it is recorded that Hereward the Wake took refuge in Cornwall in the 11th century at the court of the Cornish Prince or King Alef.

Cornish earls
If he is not to be identified with Hywel Dda of Deheubarth, the singularly recorded Huwal could have been the last native king. Some of the later supposed rulers listed below are given the title 'Earl of Cornwall', although in two cases may have been recognized as rebel kings (Conan in 934 and Cadoc in 1100).

Conan (c.926–c.937)
Rolope ap Alanorus (fl. c.940s)
Vortegyn Helin ap Rolope (Vortegyn the High Lord) (fl. c.960s) as 'Duke of Cornwall and Wessex'
Veffyne ap Vortegyn (fl. c.980s) as 'Duke of Cornwall and Wessex'
Alured ap Veffyne (fl. c.1000s) as 'Duke of Cornwall and Wessex'
Godwyn ap Alured (fl. c.1010) as 'Duke of Cornwall and Wessex', possibly Godwin, Earl of Wessex
Herbert FitzGodwyn (fl. c.1050)
Condor of Cornwall (pre-1066–c.1068; probably legendary)
Robert, Comte de Mortain (c.1068–c.1084)
William FitzRobert (c.1084–c.1106) (opposed by Cadoc ap Cador)
Cadoc (fl. c.1100; probably legendary)

Cadoc's daughter Avice is said to have married William FitzRobert de Mortaigne and the title of Earl of Cornwall passed to the Normans and never returned to the native royal family.

References

Sources

Further reading

Stenton, F. M. (1971). Anglo-Saxon England Third Edition Oxford: Oxford University Press 
Morris, John. (2004). The Age of Arthur AS Edition Phoenix  

Craig Weatherhill (2018). The Promontory People  Francis Boutle Publishers.

Dumnonia